Leonardo da Vinci was a  of the  Italian navy during World War II. It operated in the Atlantic from September 1940 until its loss in May 1943, and became the top scoring non-German submarine of the entire war.

Construction
Leonardo da Vinci was built at the CRDA shipyard in Monfalcone, near Trieste, Italy's leading submarine builder. One of six boats of the Marconi class, which were laid down in 1938–39, Leonardo da Vinci was launched in September 1939. Designed as an ocean-going vessel, she was intended for operations both in the Mediterranean and in the Atlantic.

Service history
With Italy's entry into World War II in June 1940 Leonardo da Vinci was dispatched to the Atlantic to Bordeaux in occupied France to serve in the Italian submarine flotilla there, BETASOM. She arrived October 1940 after a successful transit of the Straits of Gibraltar, scene of a number of Axis submarine losses.

Leonardo da Vinci carried out 11 war patrols, sinking 17 ships of 120,243 GRT, which included the 21,500-ton ocean liner . Leonardo da Vinci was Italy's most successful submarine in World War II, and her captain, Lt. Gianfranco Gazzana-Priaroggia, Italy's leading submarine ace. 
In July 1942 Leonardo da Vinci was assigned to a special operation aimed at mounting raids on harbours on the eastern seaboard of the United States. However, the operation was delayed due to the need for modifications to the CA craft and Leonardo da Vinci returned to action to the Atlantic.

Planned attack on New York Harbor
Leonardo da Vinci was to be used on a clandestine attack on the New York Harbor. The project, first started in July 1942 by Junio Valerio Borghese, involved launching Leonardo da Vinci from the BETASOM base in Bordeaux to the mouth of the Hudson River loaded with a CA-class submarine and a team of divers armed with 28 explosive charges. Once in position, the divers would take the CA-class into the harbor. Their charges – ranging in size from 20 to 100 kg – would be set to undermine the ships in the harbor.

Early tests carried out in August 1942 were promising, showing that Leonardo da Vinci could effectively launch the CA-class and recover it. In reality, however, recovery of the CA-class was a remote possibility, and it was more likely that the divers would have to destroy the vehicle once they had completed setting their charges.

The mission was postponed following the loss of Leonardo da Vinci, and was ultimately canceled when the armistice was signed four months later.

Last patrol
In March 1943 Leonardo da Vinci made her last and most successful patrol, to the South Atlantic.
On 14 March she sank the Empress of Canada en route to Takoradi, West Africa. She was carrying Italian prisoners of war, and Polish and Greek refugees, and of the 1800 people on board, 392 perished.
On 19 March Leonardo da Vinci torpedoed and sank the 7,628 ton British cargo ship  in the South Atlantic. She captured and took on board one survivor; two other men survived following a 50-day ordeal on a liferaft.

In April 1943 Leonardo da Vinci sank four vessels in the Indian Ocean off the coast of Durban.

Fate
After the last sinking at the end of April, Leonardo da Vinci turned for home. On 22 May 1943, off the coast of Spain, her commander unwisely signaled his intention to head for Bordeaux. There were no survivors.

Successes

References

Notes

Bibliography
 Erminio Bagnasco, Submarines of World War Two, Cassell & Co, London. 1977 
 Blair, Clay, Hitler's U-boat War: The Hunters, 1939–1942. Random House 1996. 
 Roger Chesneau, Robert Gardiner: Conway's All the World's Fighting Ships 1922–1946 (1980). 
 Paul Kemp : Underwater Warriors (1997) 
 Giorgerini, Giorgio : Uomini sul fondo. Storia del sommergibilismo italiano dalle origini a oggi, Mondadori, 2002, .

External links 
 Leonardo da Vinci at regiamarina.net
 U-boats off Natal Bill Bizley
 Leonardo da Vinci (1939) Marina Militare website

Marconi-class submarines
Ships built in Monfalcone
1939 ships
World War II submarines of Italy
Lost submarines of Italy
World War II shipwrecks in the Atlantic Ocean
Ships built by Cantieri Riuniti dell'Adriatico
Maritime incidents in May 1943
Warships lost in combat with all hands
Leonardo da Vinci
Submarines sunk by British warships